Gubernatorial elections were held in Russia on 11 September 2022 in 15 federal subjects. Seven incumbent governors were seeking re-election. 

Three regions, namely Tambov, Vladimir and Yaroslavl oblasts, had their governors resigned in October 2021. On 10 May 2022, the incumbent governors of five other regions announced their resignations: Valery Radayev of Saratov Oblast and Sergey Zhvachkin of Tomsk Oblast finished their second term early, while Alexander Yevstifeyev of Mari El, Nikolay Lyubimov of Ryazan Oblast and Igor Vasilyev of Kirov Oblast resigned shortly before the end of the first five-year term.

Race summary

Popular vote

Vote in parliament

See also
Elections in Russia

References

External links
2022 Russian elections and beyond

Gubernatorial elections in Russia
2022 elections in Russia
2022 Russian gubernatorial elections